Sewmor sewing machines were designed and manufactured in post-World War II Japan (mainly using parts from miscellaneous Asian countries, though the 900 series motors are said to be manufactured in Belgium) and imported/badged by the Consolidated Sewing Machine Corporation in New York City, New York.

Numerous models existed, with many units proving to have a fairly reliable track record over the years. A few models have recently been becoming a more sought collectors item, generally due to their aesthetic similarities to American automobiles of the same era.

See also
 List of sewing machine brands

References 

Sewing machine brands
Defunct companies of Japan